Studio Dumbar is a highly influential Dutch graphic design agency with a long heritage. Its work has helped shape, not only Dutch, but international design for over four decades.

History
Studio Dumbar was founded by Gert Dumbar in 1977, in the Hague. In 2003, the studio moved to Rotterdam, as Michel de Boer took over the creative direction, after Gert Dumbar’s retirement. In 2011 Liza Enebeis became the studio’s third creative director. The studio is also lead by Tom Dorresteijn, Strategy Director since 2005, and Wouter Dirks, Operations Director since 2016. In 2016 the studio became part of Dept, a digital agency with over 2500 specialists in 19 countries.

Philosophy and influence
Studio Dumbar describes itself as “an international branding agency specialised in visual identity and communication design” meaning that it creates every visible expression of a brand or organisation — offline and online. Its international scope is reflected in its team, with an average of seven nationalities in Rotterdam.

Fragmented, sometimes complex to the edge of chaos, and layered with complex typography, many Dumbar projects in the early 1980s caused consternation among advocates of a more ordered aesthetic. But by the late 1980s many European designers were mimicking Studio Dumbar’s approach, causing Gert Dumbar to place a moratorium on these techniques within his firm.

Awards

Communication Arts Typography Competition - Award of Excellence 2019
The Webby Awards - Honoree 2018 
Communication Arts Design Competition - Award of Excellence 2016
European Design Awards - Best of Show 2013
Red Dot - Best of best 2011
Red Dot - Grand Prix 2006
Nederlandse Designprijzen - Grand Prix 2006
D&AD - Gold 1982, 1987

References

External links
 Official Studio Dumbar site
 Official Dept Agency site

Graphic design studios